Hendrick is a surname. Notable people with the name include:

 Burton J. Hendrick (1858–1936), American historian
 Calvin W. Hendrick (born 1865), American engineer
 George Hendrick (born 1949), American baseball player
 Harvey Hendrick (1897–1941), American baseball player
 Hendrick Tejonihokarawa (c. 1660 – c. 1735), Mohawk leader, one of the "Four Mohawk Kings"
 Hendrick Theyanoguin (1692–1755), Mohawk leader usually conflated with Hendrick Tejonihokarawa
 Howard Hendrick (date of birth unknown), American politician
 Jeff Hendrick (born 1992), Irish professional footballer
 John Kerr Hendrick (1849–1921), American politician
 Kenny Hendrick (born 1969), American race car driver
 Mark Hendrick (born 1958), British politician
 Mike Hendrick (1948–2021), English cricketer
 Paul Hendrick (born 1956), Canadian radio sportscaster
 Ray Hendrick (1929–1990), American race car driver
 Rick Hendrick (born 1949), American race car owner
 Ricky Hendrick (1980–2004), American race car driver
 Thomas Augustine Hendrick (1849–1909), American Catholic bishop

 Ian Hendrick (1969-present), Irish Musician

 Patrick Hendrick (1991-present), Irish Musician

See also 

 Hendric
 Hendricks (surname)
 Hendrickx
 Hendrik (disambiguation)
 Hendriks
 Hendrikx
 Hendrix (disambiguation)
 Hendryx
 Henrik
 Henry (disambiguation)
 Henryk (given name)

Patronymic surnames
Surnames from given names